Ernst Zacharias (21 June 1924 – 6 July 2020) was a German musician and engineer. In the 1950s and 1960s, he invented various electro-mechanical musical instruments for the German musical instrument manufacturer Hohner, including the Cembalet, the Clavinet, the Guitaret, and the Pianet. The Claviola, a modernisation of the sheng and the Harmonetta, a mouth-blown concertina-keyboarded instrument, was also invented by Zacharias. He additionally invented the Electra-Melodica, the first commercially produced wind synthesizer. DEPATIS lists 90 patents by Ernst Zacharias for Hohner, including plastic recorders and watch and clock mechanisms.

References

External links 
2003/228/1 Electric keyboard, Hohner Pianet, timber / metal / plastic, designed by Ernst Zacharias, made by Hohner AG, West Germany, 1962-1970 (D*Hub)
DEPATIS patents Zacharias (Search for (Ernst (L) Zacharias)/IN)

1924 births
2020 deaths
German male musicians
Inventors of musical instruments